was a Japanese sculptor and art professor at Tokyo Zokei University. He was born in Ibaraki Prefecture and died of a brain tumor at a hospital in Chiba Prefecture.

References

Artists from Ibaraki Prefecture
1925 births
2007 deaths
20th-century Japanese sculptors